Sybil Lewis was an actress in the United States. An African American, she appeared in several films including musicals during the 1940s. She appeared in African American films (race films) and Hollywood pictures. She had starring roles in several African American films including Lucky Gamblers and Am I Guilty? and portrayed smaller roles including as a maid in Hollywood films. She also had a leading role in Broken Strings (film) in 1940.

She starred with Pigmeat Markham and John Bunn, Jr. in vaudeville shows at the Apollo Theater in Harlem, New York.

Born
Sybil N. Sanford
Pornnn
San Francisco, California, USA

Died
September 28, 1988 (age 68) 
San Mateo County, California, USA

Filmography
 Am I Guilty? (1940)
 Mystery in Swing (1940), as Cleo Ellis
 Broken Strings (film) (1940) as Grace
 Revenge of the Zombies (1943) as Rosella
 Going My Way (1944), maid at Metropolitan Opera House
 The Very Thought of You (1944)
 Lucky Gamblers (1946)
 Midnight Menace (1946)
 Boy! What a Girl! (1947), as Mme. Deborah Martin
 Miracle in Harlem (1948) as Alice Adams

References

African-American actresses
American film actresses
20th-century American actresses
20th-century African-American women
20th-century African-American people